The ESPN Wide World of Sports Resort Area is the area located near the ESPN Wide World of Sports Complex in the southern part of the Walt Disney World Resort. The farthest resort area from most of the theme parks, it includes two value-priced resorts that surround an artificial body of water called Hourglass Lake. The resorts are connected via a walking trail surrounding the lake and a footbridge crossing the lake previously called the Generation Gap Bridge. A terminal for the Disney Skyliner aerial gondola system is located at the center of the Hourglass Lake footbridge.

Resorts
Disney's Art of Animation Resort 
Disney's Pop Century Resort

See also
Animal Kingdom Resort Area
Disney Springs Resort Area
Epcot Resort Area
Magic Kingdom Resort Area

External links
Disney's Official Resorts

ESPN Wide World of Sports Resort Area